Year 1175 (MCLXXV) was a common year starting on Wednesday (link will display the full calendar) of the Julian calendar.

Events 
 By place 

 England 
 King Henry II begins living openly with his mistress Rosamund Clifford, raising suspicions about their relationship and alienating Henry's wife, Queen Eleanor of Aquitaine.
 Eleanor of Aquitaine is held under house arrest at Old Sarum Castle in Wiltshire. She is kept in comfort there – fine clothes for her are dispatched regularly from London. 
 Treaty of Windsor: High King Ruaidrí Ua Conchobair (or Roderic O'Conner) relinquishes his title and agrees to submit to Henry II as vassal of Connacht in Ireland.
 Winter – The Massacre of Abergavenny ends with several Welsh noblemen dead, at the orders of Lord William de Braose.

 Europe 
 Under the admirals of the clan Banu Mardanish, an Almohad fleet suffers a large defeat at the hand of the Portuguese, as they are trying to re-conquer Lisbon.
 Vordingborg Castle is completed by King Valdemar I (the Great) of Denmark as a defensive fortress.
 The University of Modena and Reggio Emilia in Italy is founded.

 Levant 
 May 22 – A group of Isma'ili Assassins gains access into Saladin's camp and attempts to kill him during the siege of Aleppo. But his bodyguard saves his life, the others are slain while trying to escape.

 Asia 
 The Chinese court establishes several government-paper money factories in the cities of Chengdu, Hangzhou and Huizhou. In Hangzhou alone a daily workforce of more than 1,000 men is employed.
 The Namayan Kingdom formed by a confederation of barangays, reaches its peak on Luzon (modern Philippines).

 By topic 

 Religion 
 The High Academy of the Bosnian Church in Moštre (modern-day Visoko), is first mentioned in the Vatican archives.
 Count Raymond of Tripoli appoints William II as chancellor of Jerusalem and is elected as archbishop of Tyre.

Births 
 February 4 – Nadaungmya, king of Burma (d. 1235)
 Al-Zahir, caliph of the Abbasid Caliphate (d. 1226)
 Emo of Friesland, Frisian scholar and abbot (d. 1237)
 Frederick I (the Catholic), duke of Austria (d. 1198)
 Henry Audley (or Aldithel), English nobleman (d. 1246)
 Herman II, German nobleman (House of Lippe) (d. 1229)
 Hōjō Tokifusa, Japanese nobleman and monk (d. 1240)
 Margaret of Hungary, Byzantine empress (d. 1223)
 Michael Scot, Scottish mathematician and scholar (d. 1232)
 Otto IV, Holy Roman Emperor (House of Welf) (d. 1218)
 Philip I (the Noble), margrave of Namur (d. 1212)
 Raymond of Penyafort, Spanish Dominican friar (d. 1275)
 Robert Grosseteste, English statesman (d. 1253)
 Roger III, king of Sicily (House of Hauteville) (d. 1193)
 Śārṅgadeva, Indian musicologist and writer (d. 1247)
 Subutai, Mongol general and strategist (d. 1248)
 Theodore I (Laskaris), emperor of Nicaea (d. 1221)
 Yolanda, empress of the Latin Empire (d. 1219)

Deaths 
 January 12 – Yi Ui-bang, Korean military leader (b. 1121)
  January 24 – Ibn Asakir, Syrian historian and mystic (b. 1105)
 March 5 – Frederick of Hallum, Frisian priest and abbot
 May 15 – Mleh I, prince of Armenia ("Lord of the Mountains")
 May 25 – Ishoyahb V, patriarch of the Church of the East 
 July 1 – Reginald de Dunstanville, English nobleman (b. 1110)
 July 27 – Ponce de Minerva, French nobleman and general 
 October 19 – Andrew of Saint Victor, English abbot and scholar
 November 13 – Henry of France, archbishop of Reims (b. 1121)
 Clementia of Zähringen, duchess of Bavaria and Saxony
 Maria Torribia (or la Cabeza), Spanish laywoman and hermit
 Nicholas Hagiotheodorites, Byzantine scholar and official

References